Mind Magic can refer to:

 Mind Magic (album), an album by David Oliver
 Mind Magic (magazine), a 1931 American pulp magazine

See also
 "Mind Is the Magic"